Sierksdorf is a municipality in the district of Ostholstein, in Schleswig-Holstein, Germany, situated on the Bay of Lübeck. The Hansa Park amusement park is located in Sierksdorf.

References

External links

 Internet presence of Sierksdorf on the website of the Amt Ostholstein-Mitte (German)

Ostholstein
Populated coastal places in Germany (Baltic Sea)